The Western Cape Department of Community Safety is the department of the Western Cape government responsible for policing. As of February 2022, its political head is Anroux Marais.

See also
Crime in South Africa

References

External links
Western Cape Department: Community Safety

Government of the Western Cape
Law enforcement in South Africa
Public safety ministries